The Irish airline Ryanair recognises several pilot unions, while it has more limited recognition of cabin-crew and on ground staff. In 2017, Ryanair reversed its long time anti-union stance and recognized pilot unions for the first time.

Transnational 
The European Cockpit Association, European Works Council

Ireland 
Ryanair faced down Irish trade unions on multiple occasions. In the 1990s against SIPTU after a strike in Dublin Airport, and in a landmark ruling "Ryanair v. The Labour Court", the court determined Ryanair had a right to operate a non-union company.

In 2022 Ryanair announced a tentative collective agreement with pilots union Fórsa union.

Belgium 
In 2011, Belgium cabin-crew members of Ryanair sued in local court, demanding that Ryanair observe Belgian labour laws instead of Irish labour laws, the country of the headquarters.

Italy 
In August 2018, Ryanair signed its first agreement with Italian pilot union ANPAC.

References 

Ryanair
Ryanair